Dom João Afonso da Costa de Sousa de Macedo (February 11, 1815 – September 24, 1890) was the 2nd Count of Mesquitela and 1st Duke of Albuquerque. Born and died in Lisbon, he was son of Luís da Costa de Sousa de Macedo e Albuquerque, the 1st Count of Mesquitela and Maria Inácia de Saldanha Oliveira e Daun, from the family of Marquis of Pombal.

Biography 

After his studies at the Nobility College (Colégio dos Nobres) in Lisbon, he travelled around Europe (visiting Spain, France and England) and was nominee attaché to the Portuguese embassy in Paris. After his father’s death in 1853, he returned to Portugal and he became 2nd Count of Mesquitela and 4th Viscount of Mesquitela, joining the Chamber of Peers (the upper house of the 19th century Portuguese Parliament).

He escorted Princess Stephanie of Hohenzollern-Sigmaringen during her disembarkation when she arrived in Lisbon to marry King Pedro V of Portugal. He had the same honour when Princess Maria Pia of Savoy landed in Lisbon to marry King Luis I of Portugal.

In 1870, he was invited to be foreign minister in the government of the Duke of Saldanha, who promised him the title of Duke. As he was not a politician, he refused both the post and the title.

He was a remarkable and very considered person in Portuguese society, and King Luis I of Portugal, by a royal decree dated from May 19, 1886, granted him the title of Duke of Albuquerque.

He did not marry and had no children.

Other titles 

He held peerages both in the United Kingdom of Great Britain and Ireland and the Kingdom of Portugal:

 2nd Count of Mesquitela;
 4th Viscount of Mesquitela;
 6th Baron of Mullingar (Ireland)
 Lord of the Quinta da Bacalhoa
 King of Arms from the Portuguese Royal Household
 Grand Cross of the Order of the Immaculate Conception of Vila Viçosa
 Grand Cross of the Order of Christ
 Grand Cross of the Order of Charles III.

External links 
 Genealogy of the 1st Duke of Albuquerque

Bibliography 

"Nobreza de Portugal e Brasil" - Vol II, page 215. Published by Zairol Lda., Lisbon 1989

101
1815 births
1890 deaths
Portuguese nobility
People from Lisbon
Grand Crosses of the Order of Christ (Portugal)
Knights Grand Cross of the Order of the Immaculate Conception of Vila Viçosa